Xiji County (Xiao'erjing=ثِ‌ڭِ ثِيًا) is a county under the administration of the prefecture-level city of Guyuan in the southwest of the Ningxia Hui Autonomous Region of the People's Republic of China, bordering Gansu province to the west.

Characteristics

Xiji County is an agricultural county, and its main product are wheat, pea, potatoes, buckwheat, vegetables. Common vegetables grown include cabbage, Chinese cabbage, celery, tomatoes, chili peppers, cucumbers, garlic, and melons. The county government is located in the town of Jiqiang, and the district's postal code is 756200.

Administrative divisions
Xiji County has 3 towns and 7 townships.
3 towns
 Jiqiang
 Pingfeng
 Xinglong

7 townships
 Wangmin
 Xitan
 Xingping
 Zhenhu
 Majian
 Tianping
 Hongyao

Climate

References

County-level divisions of Ningxia
Guyuan